In business management, micromanagement is a management style whereby a manager closely observes, controls, and/or reminds the work of their subordinates or employees.

Micromanagement is generally considered to have a negative connotation, mainly because it shows a lack of freedom and trust in the workplace.

Definition
Merriam-Webster's online dictionary defines micromanagement as "manage[ment] especially with excessive control or attention on details". Dictionary.com defines micromanagement as "manage[ment] or control with excessive attention to minor details". The online dictionary Encarta defined micromanagement as "atten[tion] to small details in management: control [of] a person or a situation by paying extreme attention to small details".

Often, this excessive obsession with the most minute of details causes a direct management failure in the ability to focus on the major details.

Symptoms
Rather than giving general instructions on smaller tasks and then devoting time to supervising larger concerns, the micromanager monitors and assesses every step of a business process and avoids delegation of decisions. Micromanagers are usually irritated when a subordinate makes decisions without consulting them, even if the decisions are within the subordinate's level of authority.

Micromanagement also frequently involves requests for unnecessary and overly detailed reports ("reportomania"). A micromanager tends to require constant and detailed performance feedback and to focus excessively on procedural trivia (often in detail greater than they can actually process) rather than on overall performance, quality and results. This focus on "low-level" trivia often delays decisions, clouds overall goals and objectives, restricts the flow of information between employees, and guides the various aspects of a project in different and often opposed directions. Many micromanagers accept such inefficiencies as less important than their retention of control or of the appearance of control.

It is common for micromanagers, especially those who exhibit narcissistic tendencies and/or micromanage deliberately and for strategic reasons, to delegate work to subordinates and then micromanage those subordinates' performance, enabling the micromanagers in question to both take credit for positive results and shift the blame for negative results to their subordinates. These micromanagers thereby delegate accountability for failure but not the authority to take alternative actions that would have led to success or at least to the mitigation of that failure.

The most extreme cases of micromanagement constitute a management pathology closely related to workplace bullying and narcissistic behavior. Micromanagement resembles addiction in that although most micromanagers are behaviorally dependent on control over others, both as a lifestyle and as a means of maintaining that lifestyle, many of them fail to recognize and acknowledge their dependence even when everyone around them observes it.

Causes
The most frequent motivations for micromanagement are internal and related to the personality of the manager.  However, external factors such as organizational culture may also play a role.

Micromanagement can also stem from a breakdown in the fundamentals of delegation. When a task or project is delegated in an unclear way, or where there is a lack of trust between the manager and the person doing the work, micromanagement naturally ensues. Clearer delegation, with a well defined goal, clear vision of the constraints and dependencies, and effective oversight, can help prevent micromanagement.

Effects
Because a pattern of micromanagement suggests to employees that a manager does not trust their work or judgment, it is a major factor in triggering employee disengagement, often to the point of promoting a dysfunctional and hostile work environment. Disengaged employees invest time, but not effort or creativity, in the work in which they are assigned. The effects of this phenomenon are worse in situations where work is passed from one specialized employee to another.  In such a situation, apathy among upstream employees affects not only their own productivity but also that of their downstream colleagues.

See also

References

Further reading
 Harry Chambers: "My Way or the Highway: The Micromanagement Survival Guide", Berrett-Koehler Publishers (2004), 
 Niko Canner and Ethan Bernstein: "Why is Micromanagement So Infectious?", Harvard Business Review, 17 August

External links
 Softpanorama micromanagement page
 Organizational Realities - Micromanagement: What It Is and How to Deal with It
 The Real Cost of Micromanagement

Management
Narcissism
Pejorative terms
Workplace
Workplace bullying
Waste of resources